SS Deltargentino may refer to one of two Type C3-P&C ships built for the United States Maritime Commission by Bethlehem Sparrows Point Shipyard and intended for the Mississippi Shipping Company:

  (MC hull number 152), transferred to the United States Navy as transport USS Monrovia (AP-64); later converted to an attack transport and redesignated APA-31; scrapped 1968

Ship names